Tayga is a town in Kemerovo Oblast, Russia, located  northwest of Kemerovo. Population: 

The town is one of the biggest railway junctions in Russia.

Geography
The town is a railroad junction on Trans-Siberian Railway, and also the starting point of the Tayga–Bely Yar branch of the Western Siberian Railway, which provides access to Tomsk.

History
Tayga was founded in the end of the 19th century due to the construction of the Trans-Siberian Railway. The station was opened in 1898. In 1911, Tayga was granted town status.

Administrative and municipal status
Within the framework of administrative divisions, it is, together with five rural localities, incorporated as Tayga Town Under Oblast Jurisdiction—an administrative unit with the status equal to that of the districts. As a municipal division, Tayga Town Under Oblast Jurisdiction is incorporated as Tayginsky Urban Okrug.

Culture and recreation
Tayga contains ten objects classified as cultural and historical heritage of local significance. Five of them are monuments of architecture, and the other five are monuments of history.

Monuments of architecture

Monuments of history

References

Notes

Sources

Cities and towns in Kemerovo Oblast